Santa Cruz Recreativo Esporte Clube, commonly known as Santa Cruz, is a Brazilian football team based in Santa Rita, Paraíba state. They competed in the Série C twice.

History
The club was founded on April 15, 1939. They competed in the Série C in 1994 and in 1995, being eliminated in the Second Stage in both editions of the competition. Santa Cruz won the Campeonato Paraibano in 1995 and in 1996.

Achievements

 Campeonato Paraibano:
 Winners (2): 1995, 1996

Stadium
Santa Cruz Recreativo Esporte Clube play their home games at Estádio Virgínio Veloso Borges, nicknamed Teixeirão. The stadium has a maximum capacity of 5,000 people.

Notable former players
Players that had international caps for their respective countries.

 Mazinho

References

Association football clubs established in 1939
Football clubs in Paraíba
1939 establishments in Brazil